Cosme da Silva Campos (born 21 December 1952), known as just Campos, is a Brazilian footballer. He played in five matches for the Brazil national football team in 1975. He was also part of Brazil's squad for the 1975 Copa América tournament.

References

External links
 

1952 births
Living people
Brazilian footballers
Brazil international footballers
Association football forwards
People from Pedro Leopoldo
Clube Atlético Mineiro players
Nacional Futebol Clube players
Guarani FC players
Clube Náutico Capibaribe players
Esporte Clube São Bento players
América Futebol Clube (MG) players
Santos FC players
Ceará Sporting Club players
Associação Portuguesa de Desportos players
Operário Futebol Clube (MS) players
Associação Ferroviária de Esportes players
Colorado Esporte Clube players
Operário Futebol Clube (Várzea Grande) players
Marília Atlético Clube players
São José Esporte Clube players